Rout is a surname. It may refer to:

 Alexandra Rout (born 1993), New Zealand figure skater
 Baji Rout, Indian boy shot dead by police in British India
 Ettie Annie Rout (1887-1936), New Zealand writer and educator
 Girjia Rout, Indian cricketer
 Jachindra Rout, Indian Odia-language poet and translator
 Joanne Rout, British Paralympic swimmer
 Jyoti Rout, Indian classical dancer
 Padmini Rout (born 1994), Indian chess player
 Saraswati Rout, Indian weightlifter
 Satyabrata Rout, Indian theatre director and scenographer

Surnames